The Manchester Exchange by-election of 27 June 1973 was held after the death of William Griffiths on 14 April of the same year. The Labour Party won the by-election in what had traditionally been a safe seat.

Due to an administrative oversight, the by-election was held on a Wednesday, rather than the Thursday which had been usual since the mid-1960s.  Only one by-election since has been held on a day other than a Thursday, the 1978 Hamilton by-election.

Results

References

Manchester Exchange by-election
Exchange
Manchester Exchange by-election
Manchester Exchange by-election
1970s in Manchester